Anaconda is a wooden roller coaster at Walygator Parc that opened in 1989.

References